Opus (pl. opera) is a Latin word meaning "work". Italian equivalents are opera (singular) and opere (pl.).

Opus or OPUS may refer to:

Arts and entertainment

Music
 Opus number, (abbr. Op.) specifying order of (usually) publication, and hence applied to collections as well as individual compositions
 OPUS Records, a Slovak record label
 Opus 111, a French classical record label bought by Naive

Bands
 Opus (Austrian band), an Austrian pop-rock group
 Opus (Yugoslav band), a former Yugoslav progressive rock group
 Opus III (band), an English electronic pop group
 Pur (band), a German pop group originally known as "Opus"

Albums
 Opus (Opus album), 1987 album by Austrian band Opus
 Opus (Schiller album), 2013 album by German music project Schiller
 Opus, a 2014 album by Jane Badler
 Opus (Eric Prydz album), 2016 album by the electronic artist Eric Prydz
 "Opus" (Eric Prydz song), song from the eponymous album.
 Opus, a 2007 compilation album by Mr. Sam
 Opus 1 (album), 1975 album by the Yugoslav band Opus
  Opus (Marc Anthony album), 2019 album by Puerto Rican singer Marc Anthony

Publications
 Opus (comic strip), by Berkeley Breathed
 Opus the Penguin, the title character of the strip, originally from Bloom County
 Opus (manga), a manga by Satoshi Kon
 Opus (University of Newcastle magazine), a student newspaper of the University of Newcastle, Australia
 Opus (classical record magazine), an American magazine

Other arts
 Opus (play), a 2006 play by Michael Hollinger
 Work of art (L. opus)
Magnum opus or masterwork

Computing
 Opus (audio format), an audio coding format
 Opus (microkernel), an operating system kernel
 Opus-CBCS, a computer bulletin board system
 Directory Opus, a file manager program
 OPUS (software), digital repository software

Organisations
 Opus Group Berhad, a consortium of several different companies operating under the Opus brand name
 Opus Energy, an electricity and gas supplier based in the United Kingdom
 Opus College of Business, United States

Transportation
 OPUS card, a card used for public transit in Quebec, Canada
 Opus, a bus manufactured by Optima Bus Corporation

Other uses
 Opus (mythology), a son of Zeus
 Opus, Greece, a city in ancient Locris, Greece
 Opus (Elis), a town in ancient Elis, Greece
 Opus (architecture), a series of constructing methods in use in Ancient Rome
 Opus pontis, cost of paying for bridge work in Ancient Rome and the Roman Empire
 OPUS (chromatography), a line of chromatography columns manufactured by Repligen Corporation

See also
 Mr. Holland's Opus, a 1995 film starring Richard Dreyfuss
 Magnum opus (disambiguation)
 Opera (disambiguation) (plural form of opus)
 Opus Dei (disambiguation)